In mathematics, a biquadratic field is a number field K of a particular kind, which is a Galois extension of the rational number field Q  with Galois group the Klein four-group.

Structure and subfields
Biquadratic fields are all obtained by adjoining two square roots. Therefore in explicit terms they have the form

K = Q()

for rational numbers a and b. There is no loss of generality in taking a and b to be non-zero and square-free integers. 

According to Galois theory, there must be three quadratic fields contained in K, since the Galois group has three subgroups of index 2. The third subfield, to add to the evident Q() and Q(), is Q().

L-function
Biquadratic fields are the simplest examples of abelian extensions of Q that are not cyclic extensions. According to general theory the Dedekind zeta-function of such a field is a product of the Riemann zeta-function and three Dirichlet L-functions. Those L-functions are for the Dirichlet characters which are the Jacobi symbols attached to the three quadratic fields. Therefore taking the product of the Dedekind zeta-functions of the quadratic fields, multiplying them together, and dividing by the square of the Riemann zeta-function, is a recipe for the Dedekind zeta-function of the biquadratic field. This illustrates also some general principles on abelian extensions, such as the calculation of the conductor of a field. 

Such L-functions have applications in analytic theory (Siegel zeroes), and in some of Kronecker's work.

References
Section 12 of 

Algebraic number theory
Galois theory